Gunde Anders Svan (born 12 January 1962) is a Swedish former cross-country skier and auto racing driver. During his cross-country skiing career he won a total of four gold, one silver and one bronze medals at the Winter Olympics. Svan won a total of seven golds, three silvers, and one bronze at the FIS Nordic World Ski Championships. Svan also won the 15 km once (1983) and the 50 km twice (1986, 1990) at the Holmenkollen ski festival. In 1984, he earned the Svenska Dagbladet Gold Medal, and in 1985, he earned the Holmenkollen medal (shared with Anette Bøe and Per Bergerud). He is a board member of the International Ski Federation.

Biography
During his skiing career he became known for his dedication and attention to detail. For instance, he used a lighter alloy on the tips of his ski poles, saving .  He won two golds (15 km and relay), one bronze (30 km) and one silver (50 km) at the 1984 Winter Olympics in Sarajevo.  At the 1988 Winter Olympics in Calgary, he won two golds for 50 km and relay.  He also won the World championship gold six times and won the World cup five times.

As a competitor in rallycross he got one gold medal in the Swedish Championship and a bronze medal in the FIA European Championship for Rallycross Drivers (1995: Division 1 – Group N category; with a Toyota Celica GT-Four).  One of the reasons for getting into another sport was that some people called him a natural skier while he himself maintained that it's just a matter of will and dedication, according to his famous tagline "nothing is impossible".  He applied the same methods to his driving as his skiing and even built his own reaction-tester to practice for the rallycross eminently important starts. When his compatriot and teamboss, the late Christer Bohlin, was not able to fulfill his promise to upgrade his Toyota team for 1996 into the top ERC category (Division 2 by then), Svan quit and gave up rallycross.

After retiring from his athletic career he has worked as the host for some game shows such as the Swedish version of American Gladiators, Fort Boyard and Bingolotto.  He has played a seductive lady in the short movie En handelsresandes nöd, directed by rock group Svenne Rubins and starring Claes Månsson, Björn Skifs and Gert Klötzke.  He has also appeared in numerous commercials including a famous commercial where he impersonated fellow skier Thomas Wassberg.

Svan resigned from his position as Chief of Cross-Country for Sweden on the week of 4 May 2009 after he was involved in its reorganization.

He participated in Let's Dance 2018 broadcast on TV4 where he finished third together with Jeanette Carlsson.

He retired to his  forest farm, where he worked with his son, Ferry Svan, and now supports his children's careers.

Cross-country skiing results
All results are sourced from the International Ski Federation (FIS).

Olympic Games
 6 medals – (4 gold, 1 silver, 1 bronze)

World Championships
 11 medals – (7 gold, 3 silver, 1 bronze)

World Cup

Season titles
 5 titles – (5 overall)

Season standings

Individual podiums
 30 victories 
 46 podiums

Team podiums
 9 victories 
 14 podiums 

Note:  Until the 1999 World Championships and the 1994 Winter Olympics, World Championship and Olympic races were included in the World Cup scoring system.

Racing record

Complete FIA European Rallycross Championship results

Division 1

References

External links
 
 
 
 
  
  
 May 8, 2009 article on changes in cross-country skiing, including Svan's resignation.

1962 births
Living people
People from Vansbro Municipality
Cross-country skiers from Dalarna County
Cross-country skiers at the 1984 Winter Olympics
Cross-country skiers at the 1988 Winter Olympics
Holmenkollen medalists
Holmenkollen Ski Festival winners
Olympic cross-country skiers of Sweden
Olympic gold medalists for Sweden
Swedish male cross-country skiers
Swedish racing drivers
Olympic medalists in cross-country skiing
FIS Nordic World Ski Championships medalists in cross-country skiing
FIS Cross-Country World Cup champions
Medalists at the 1984 Winter Olympics
Dala-Järna IK skiers
Medalists at the 1988 Winter Olympics
Olympic silver medalists for Sweden
Olympic bronze medalists for Sweden
European Rallycross Championship drivers